Teo Ho Pin (born 19 January 1960) is a Singaporean former politician who served as Mayor of North West District between 2001 and 2020.

A member of the governing People's Action Party (PAP), Teo was the Member of Parliament (MP) for Bukit Panjang SMC between 2006 and 2020, the Bukit Panjang ward of Holland–Bukit Panjang GRC between 2001 and 2006 and the Bukit Panjang ward of Sembawang GRC between 1996 and 2001. He also served as Mayor of North West District between 2001 and 2020.

Education
Teo attended New Town Secondary School and National Junior College before graduating from the National University of Singapore in 1985 with a Bachelor of Science with honours degree in building. 

He subsequently went on to complete a Master of Science degree in project managing and a PhD in building at Heriot-Watt University in 1987 and 1990 respectively.

Career
Teo was a senior lecturer at the National University of Singapore between 1985 and 1999. He also served as President of the Singapore Institute of Building between 1996 and 2002 and Consumers' Association of Singapore between 1999 and 2001.

Political career
Teo's political career began in 1996 when he was elected a member of parliament for the Sembawang Group Representation Constituency (Sembawang GRC). He subsequently served as an MP for Holland–Bukit Panjang GRC from 2001 to 2006, and for Bukit Panjang Single Member Constituency (Bukit Panjang SMC) from 2006 to 2011. In the 2011 general elections, Teo was voted into office again as an MP for Bukit Panjang SMC.

Teo was also Mayor of the North-West CDC from 2001 till his retirement in 2020 and also the Deputy Government Whip.

Teo retired from politics in 2020 and did not content in the 2020 Singaporean general election.

References

External links
 Teo Ho Pin's profile on the Singapore Parliament website

Living people
Members of the Parliament of Singapore
National University of Singapore alumni
Alumni of Heriot-Watt University
Singaporean Buddhists
Singaporean people of Hokkien descent
1960 births